Josip Čondrić (born 27 August 1993) is a Croatian professional footballer who plays as a goalkeeper of Kazakhstani club Astana.

Club career
Čondrić, hailing from Zagreb's Rudeš neighborhood, started playing football at the local club NK Rudeš, but moved between several other Zagreb-area clubs during his youth years.

He started his career on the sidelines, as third-choice at HAŠK Zagreb and, since 2013, NK Zagreb, behind Dominik Livaković and Jakša Herceg. In 2014, he was released to fourth-tier NK Trešnjevka, but returned to NK Zagreb that summer, only to be loaned on to second-tier NK Bistra. In 2015, Čondrić returned yet again to NK Zagreb, again third-choice behind Livaković and Herceg, making his Prva HNL debut in the 2-3 home loss to HNK Hajduk Split, in the last game of the season., making some key saves.

Following NK Zagreb's relegation, Čondrić became the first-choice goalkeeper in the Druga HNL, but due to the club's problems he moved to his old club, NK Rudeš, in the same league, as back-up for Krunoslav Hendija. Rudeš achieved promotion, and, following Hendija's departure for NK Lokomotiva, Čondrić came ahead of Dominik Picak and took the first-team spot, which he kept until the end of the season, being hailed as the hero of the club's home 1-0 win against subsequent champions GNK Dinamo Zagreb in May 2018.

In the summer of 2018, Čondrić moved to NK Istra 1961., sharing time in the first 11 with Ioritz Landeta After having made 58 league appearances for Istra 1961, Čondrić left the club in August 2020.

On 28 August 2020, he signed with Russian Premier League club FC Rotor Volgograd.

References

External links
 

1993 births
Footballers from Zagreb
Living people
Croatian footballers
Association football goalkeepers
NK HAŠK players
NK Zagreb players
NK Trešnjevka players
NK Bistra players
NK Rudeš players
NK Istra 1961 players
FC Rotor Volgograd players
HŠK Zrinjski Mostar players
FC Astana players
First Football League (Croatia) players
Croatian Football League players
Russian Premier League players
Premier League of Bosnia and Herzegovina players
Croatian expatriate footballers
Expatriate footballers in Russia
Croatian expatriate sportspeople in Russia
Expatriate footballers in Bosnia and Herzegovina
Croatian expatriate sportspeople in Bosnia and Herzegovina
Expatriate footballers in Kazakhstan
Croatian expatriate sportspeople in Kazakhstan